Aleksandar Martulkov also sometimes known as Aleksandar Onche Martulkov (23 October 1878 — 19 December 1962) was one of the first socialist revolutionaries and publicist from the region of Macedonia. He was a member of the Macedonian-Adrianople Social Democratic Group, part of Bulgarian Workers' Social Democratic Party, and later of IMRO (United). He advocated for the independence of Macedonia. Martulkov was also a member of the Bulgarian Parliament, as well as the Presidium of ASNOM and the Assembly of SR Macedonia. He is considered  a Macedonian in North Macedonia and a Bulgarian in Bulgaria.

Early life 
Martulkov was born on 23 October 1878 in Veles, then in the Ottoman Empire. He was born to a poor family with one brother and two parents, his father which was Jovan Martulkov worked as a baker in a local factory in Veles. His mother worked as a gardaner to a wealthy Bulgarian family in Veles. 

He studied in his hometown and according to contemporary sources he was undisciplined and would often get into arguments with other students which would eventually lead him to be expelled. and later in the Bulgarian Pedagogical School in Skopje. Due to losing his parents at the age of eight, he would develop a revolutionary and anti-monarchist ideology, because of this in 1898 he and a group of other socialist students would form a secret socialist group within the school. After the group got discovered by the authorities he would be expelled from the Pedagogical School.

During this time he stayed at his grandparents house. Subsequently Martulkov left for Sofia, where he began to develop socialist ideas as a member of the Macedonian-Adrianople Social Democratic Group. Later he moved to Geneva, Switzerland, where he studied chemistry but due to the lack of money he returned to Sofia after one year. Afterwards Martulkov returned to Ottoman Macedonia where he joined the IMARO. He worked in Veles and Kumanovo and helped wounded revolutionaries during the llinden-Preobrazhenie Uprising. Afterwards, he was a teacher in the Bulgarian school in his hometown. During this period he and other socialist revolutionaries joined the People's Federative Party (Bulgarian Section)

During The Balkan Wars and World War I 
During the Balkan Wars, he and other former IMARO revolutionaries, such as Petar Poparsov and Rizo Rizov, met with Dimitrija Čupovski, they would make an appel from the local residents from Veles to sign which would be sent to the London Conference, which would demand autonomy for Macedonia. According to Martulkov out of the 400 signers around 300 of them were either Turkish or from Turkish origins. On the eve of the Second Balkan War in 1913, he was sent by Todor Aleksandrov on a reconnaissance mission in the area of Macedonia controlled by Serbia.  

In 1914, he fled to Sofia to avoid being drafted by the Serbian authorities. He participated in IMARO's committee of deserters, which was organized by recruitment buildings in Veles and Skopje, its main task was to help people from Macedonia leave the Serbian Army and join the Bulgarian Army instead. According to Martulkov he and other locals working with IMARO had no control over which the locals joined the Serbian army or Bulgarian army.

Its been documented that he helped around 1.500 deserts. While mobilizing around 2.500 from the Veles regiment and the Kocani regiment with 2.400. Later during the First World War, he was awarded with a Bulgarian bronze medal. Around this time he also participated in the Veles Brotherhood in Sofia.

After World War I 
During the mid 1920s, he became a member of IMRO (United). In 1931, together with Hristo Traikov, he was threatened with physical violence by Ivan Mihailov's IMRO faction, because he spread communist ideas among the Macedonian emigration in Bulgaria. Hristo Traikov was killed by activists of Ivan Mihailov's wing, and Martulkov escaped with injuries.

In June 14 1932 in Sofia Martulkov published the first article of the newspaper "Makedonsko Zname" which was an organ of the immigrants from Macedonia in Bulgaria, In his newspapers he actively critizied the current state of IMRO (Autonomous) stating that the only reason it fought for autonomous Macedonia was to just unite it with Bulgaria. 

but still did not accept the Comintern's position on the existence of a separate Macedonian nation. At that time, he was one of the 32 people's representatives of the Bulgarian Communist Party in the Bulgarian Parliament. In the summer of 1935, he was arrested in Sofia, while being a deputy in the Bulgarian parliament. and tried along with other members of the IMRO (United). He was sentenced to 5 years in prison and was ordered to pay a fine because of his pro-Macedonian national views.

During and after World War II 
After the Bulgarian coup d'état in September 1944, he signed the Appeal to the Macedonians in Bulgaria along with other prominent revolutionaries, such as Pavel Shatev, Tushe Deliivanov, Petar Shandanov, Mihail Gerdzhikov and others, which agitated for a Macedonian state within Yugoslavia and accepted the Comintern's position on the Macedonian nation. After the Second World War, he moved to the PR Macedonia, where he participated in ASNOM. He would be elected as a honorary member in The Association of Macedonian Journalists. He retired in Skopje.  

Due to his contributions to Yugoslavia, he was awarded the Yugoslav Medal of Merit for the People. As an Ilinden Uprising veteran, he was awarded the Macedonian medal of Ilinden Memoirs in 1951.

In 1945, Martulkov met with Georgi Dimitrov in Sofia and mentioned his concerns on some of the pro-Serbian and anti-Bulgarian policies of the Communist Party of Macedonia, which he believed was an attempt of Serbianisation of the local population in Macedonia. 

According to some Macedonian historians Alekso Martulkov played a huge role in the making of the first constituion for the new Socialist Republic of Macedonia around 1946, while some have suggested that he only played a small role and the only reason he gained influence over the constituion was because he was member of ASNOM. 

Later Martulkov, as with many of the older left-wing IMRO government officials, would begin losing their ranks in ASNOM and influence over the Communist party of Macedonia and then isolated from the authorities in Belgrade At the end of his life he would be disappointed with the policy of the new authorities in Yugoslavia which he considered to be pro-Serbian and anti-Bulgarian oriented, Martulkov returned to Sofia, where he died on 19 December 1962.

Memoirs 
In 1954, As a part of a historical revive of IMRO history organized by the then communist Macedonian historiography would published  Martulkovs memoirs in Skopje, the book was published by the Skopian institue of national history and it was translated by writer Gjorgi Abadžiev. 

In the book Martulkov gives a detailed biography of his life and early childhood and his troubling experience with the Turkish authorities in Istanbul. In his memoirs he also mentions stories with his parents and grandparents and his experience with them, as well as writting about the Macedonian revolutionary organization and its struggle and its divides and tensions, about the fight against the Ottoman Empire and the various national propagandas spread by neighboring states  during the Macedonian Struggle.

He also talks about his role and influence over IMRO (United) and his experience meeting other infamous IMRO and IMROU revolutionaries. In his book he tells stories about his time migrating from Veles to Bulgaria and his time spend in Bulgaria He also told stories about how he met Pavel Shatev and other boatmen of Thessaloniki, how he helped organizing the Ilinden Uprising in the Veles and Kumanovo regions under the Skopje revolutionary district

Legacy 
Alekso Martulkov is known by local residents in Veles but his legacy is mostly forgotten by the population in Veles his legacy was mostly overshadowed by the legacy of other more infamous socialist from Veles such as known socialist Vasil Glavinov. Two streets in the Gjorche Petrov municipality in Skopje are named after him.

In Bulgaria, Alekso Martulkovs body is buried in a local burial in Sofia his current burial location is unknown since the Bulgarian authorities haven't provided a proper location.

References

External links 

 My Participation in the Revolutionary Struggles of Macedonia – Alekso Martulkov

1878 births
1962 deaths
World War II
Revolutionaries
Yugoslavia
Ottoman Empire
Veles, North Macedonia
Socialism